Anthony Francis Cline Jr. (born November 24, 1971) is a former American football tight end . He played high school football at Davis Senior High School and college football at Stanford University. Cline was a member of the Phi Delta Theta fraternity and studied qualitative economics during his time at Stanford.

Cline was selected by the Buffalo Bills with the 33rd pick in the fourth round (131st overall) of the 1995 NFL Draft. He played in the National Football League (NFL) for the Bills (1995–1997), Pittsburgh Steelers (1999), and San Francisco 49ers (1999). Cline retired following the 1999 season.

Cline's father, Tony Sr., was a defensive lineman for eight seasons in the NFL with the Oakland Raiders and San Francisco 49ers.

References

External links
 
 ESPN profile

1971 births
Living people
American football tight ends
Buffalo Bills players
Pittsburgh Steelers players
San Francisco 49ers players
Stanford Cardinal football players
People from Davis, California
Davis Senior High School (California) alumni
Players of American football from California